Abad-e Soleyman (also Romanized as Ābād-e Soleymān and Ābād Soleymān; also known as Ābād, Dāmdārī-ye Takāpū, and Soleymānābād) is a village in Baraan-e Shomali Rural District, in the Central District of Isfahan County, Isfahan Province, Iran. At the 2006 census, its population was 112, in 24 families.

References 

Populated places in Isfahan County